The 2014–15 Northeastern Huskies men's ice hockey team represented Northeastern University during the 2014–15 NCAA Division I men's ice hockey season. The team was coached by Jim Madigan, in his 4th season with the Huskies. The Huskies played their home games at Matthews Arena on campus in Boston, Massachusetts, competing in Hockey East.

Previous season
In 2013–14, the Huskies finished 5th in Hockey East with a record of 19–14–4, 10–8–2 in conference play. In the 2014 Hockey East Men's Ice Hockey Tournament, they lost in the quarterfinals to New Hampshire, two games to one. They failed to qualify for the 2014 NCAA Division I Men's Ice Hockey Tournament.

Personnel

Roster
As of January 7, 2015.

Coaching staff

Standings

Schedule

|-
!colspan=12 style=""| Exhibition

|-
!colspan=12 style=""| Regular Season

|-
!colspan=12 style=""| Postseason

Rankings

References

Northeastern Huskies men's ice hockey seasons
Northeastern Huskies
Northeastern Huskies